Eme Ikwuakor (born August 13, 1984) is an Nigerian-American actor. He is best known for his roles in Ink (2009), On My Block (2018), and Gorgon in Inhumans (2017).

Biography
Eme Ikwuakor was born to Patricia and Killian Ikwuakor and is one of triplets. The other triplets are a sister, Obi, and a brother, AK, who is a former All-American runner, professional athlete and the founder of the non-profit organization, Empower2Play; they also have three older brothers. Eme attended University of Colorado on a track and field scholarship. His college adviser suggested he try acting instead. His first major role was in the 2009 sci-fi film Ink. He continued to act whilst working a day job, but he decided to pursue acting full-time after writing, producing and starring in a short film called Chance.

Eme began making appearances on television shows, such as Hawaii Five-0, Castle and Extant. He also appeared as himself, alongside his brother Ak, on Are You Smarter than a 5th Grader?. Eme was cast as the Marvel Comics superhero Gorgon in Marvel's Inhumans which is part of the Marvel Cinematic Universe.

Filmography

References

External links
 

American people of Nigerian descent
Living people
American male television actors
1984 births
Male actors from Colorado
People from Wheat Ridge, Colorado